Jan Hendrix (born 1949) is a Dutch-born artist who has lived and worked in Mexico since 1978. Hendrix received the Order of the Aztec Eagle from the Mexican government for his work in art and architecture.

Life
Jan Hendrix was born in the town of Maasbree, Holland, in the midst of a family deeply rooted in the farming lifestyle of the region and drastically opposed to Hendrix's early choice of a career in the arts at the age of sixteen, after persistently failing all subjects at school with the exception of drawing. Prominent among his childhood memories is an outing in his father's first car and a visit to a local museum reminisced in the Kunst-und-Wunderkammer that would later become a clear reference in his work.

Having left the family house, at seventeen he enrolled in the Royal Academy of the Arts in Den Bosch, only to be expelled due to his rebellious behavior. Later on, through an invitation from Japanese artist Shinkichi Tajiri, he became a student at Atelier 63 in Haarlem, the most radical educational institution at the time (1968–1969). There he would meet his mentors who, through filmmaking and dance, presented him with a multidisciplinary vision of art. While pursuing his studies, he entered the Smeets printer company in Weert to learn the craft of proof printing.

From 1971 to 1975, thanks to artist JCJ van der Heyden's advice, he continued his master-degree studies at the Jan van Eyck Academie where inspired by his contact with professor Han Seur, he focused on the graphic arts. During this period he established a strong link of exchange and communication with a group of artists in Düsseldorf, which worked as a think-tank, and involved, Beuys, Richter, Spoerri, the Becher couple, Kiefer, Lupertz, Filliou, Nam June Paik and Dieter Roth, among other artists. They would influence Hendrix's postgraduate activities and projects, widening his codes of production, and ultimately leading him to choose paper and ink as his primary media. The less-than-orthodox education of these years will lead him to approach various projects related to the production of artists’ books, among them the Beau Geste Press in Devonshire, England, where he met Martha Hellion. This encounter led to marriage in Holland. Hendrix and Hellion traveled to the north of Norway where they set up a serigraphy workshop, built with the help of the local shipyard. Currently, they are separated.

Back in Maastricht, in 1975 the Dutch the Ministry of Culture granted Hendrix a scholarship, which he used to travel to Mexico thinking of studying Mexican landscape. His first contact there was José Chávez Morado, who invited him to start a serigraphy workshop in the Alhóndiga de Granaditas (an old grain warehouse), in Guanajuato, with the idea of printing the cylindrical seals from Frederick Fields’ pre-Hispanic collection. After the birth of his son Jonás in Mexico City, Hendrix became a regular visitor to Luis López Loza's workshop, a collective space in the building complex known as Edificios Condesa, where Emilio Ortiz, Fiona Alexander, and Leonora Carrington, among others, used to work. This was also a meeting place for the most active art community at the moment, which included creators, gallery owners, and printers. Hendrix met there two individuals who would exert a great influence in his career: Francisco Toledo and Gunther Gerzso. He shared with the latter ideas on ethics and the artist's perseverance.

The intense generosity of Mexicans, illustrated by Miguel Cervantes’ invitation to exhibit at the Galería Ponce, persuaded Hendrix to settle down in this country, which he did in 1978. Thus he abandoned the duality sustained by frequent trips between Holland and Mexico, with long, in-between stays in Iceland, where he had found a bottomless supply of landscapes associated to his work and to Mexico's volcanic terrain. This period crystallized in several portfolios produced in both countries, which include his first collaborations with the printer Piet Clement of Amsterdam.

Already living in Mexico, he opened his workshop designed for his own production but following the practice of the collective workshops, also accessible to other Mexican artists whom he invited to experiment with serigraphy. In this period, invited by Alejandro Luna, he also participated in the creation of some sets for the Compañía Nacional de Teatro. Simultaneously he began his research on fractal composition—an exercise that allowed him to delve deeper into the meaning of scale—and on paper supports that offered atmosphere and character in themselves. In a trip to Kenya, the intensity of light produced by its location on the Equator led him to experiment with the elimination of color and the use of high contrast as minimal elements for the construction of a landscape. Drawing became increasingly important and the pieces produced were mainly drawings transferred to the different supports he had researched and discovered. The result is compiled in the catalog Diario de fatigas.

In 1992 Hendrix launched Bitácora, a project consisting in the creation of a revolving exhibition that continues evolving as work is produced. For Bitácora he traveled to China, Australia, Indonesia, Iran, Turkey, Germany, Holland, Ireland, and Mexico (Oaxaca). While in Australia he decided to begin Script, a travel journal inspired by the need to keep track of such a journey. One of Hendrix's distinctive practices is the collaboration with writers—like Gabriel García Márquez, Seamus Heaney, Bert Schierbeek, et cetera—in the production of authors’ books, that he painstakingly illustrates with original works.

In 1999 he discovered a worldwide system of residences for artists and was fortunate enough to embark in this experience at the Bellagio Center of the Rockefeller Foundation. Here he found that a consistent monthly retreat in isolation was precisely what he required to structure the script for the contents of his work for the rest of the year. Feedback for the renovation of his work also came from his experience as a member of Fonca's Sistema Nacional de Creadores, a bridge that facilitated the exchange with a younger generation, distant enough to allow the creation of mutually stimulating links.

The list of his exhibitions in museums and galleries is very long, with three to four shows per year. His recent solo exhibitions include Sylva, Galeria de Arte Mexicano, Mexico City, Mexico (2020); Tierra firme, Bonnefanten Museum, Maastricht, Netherlands (2019); Museo Universitario Arte Contemporáneo, Mexico City, Mexico (2019); Camara Lucida, Chartreuse de La Lance, Concise, Switzerland (2018); Aeneid Book VI, Shapero Modern, London, England (2017); The We of Me, Galería de Arte Mexicano, Mexico City, Mexico (2015); La distancia más larga entre dos puntos, Galería Proyecto Paralelo, Mexico City, Mexico (2014); Drawing the distance, Galeria La Caja Negra, Madrid, Spain (2014); Kunstkammer, Galería de Arte Mexicano, Mexico City, Mexico (2013); Wolf Tree / Arbre Loup, Cillart, La Houssine, Le Mesle, France (2012); El marco natural, Fundación Cerezales Antonino y Cinia, León, Spain (2012); 10 Vistas, Centro de las Artes de San Agustín, Oaxaca, Mexico (2011); Work Done II, Galería de Arte Mexicano, Mexico City, Mexico (2010); Work Done I, Galeria La Caja Negra, Madrid, Spain (2010); Calcografía Nacional, Real Academia de Bellas Artes de San Fernando, Madrid, Spain (2010); 15 Vistas, Centro Cultural Clavijero, Morelia, Mexico (2010); Estación Norte, Centro Cultural Cajastur Palacio Revillagigedo, Gijón, Spain (2009); Malpaís, Fundación César Manique, Lanzarote, Spain (2008); Eclipse, Galería La Caja Negra, Madrid, Spain (2007); Storyboard, Instituto Cultural Cabañas, Guadalajara, Mexico; Museo Amparo, Puebla, Mexico; Museo de Arte Contemporáneo de Monterrey, Monterrey, Mexico (2006–2007).

He has developed many projects with architects, activity that has led him to work in larger formats. His most recent projects include Silver Oak, Thaddeus Stevens building, Washington D.C. USA(2020); Tableau (in collaboration with Uzyel Karp), Centro de Diseño, Cine y Televisión (CENTRO), Mexico City, TEN Arquitectos (2015); Patio de la Jacarandas, Aguascalientes, Mexico, Architects Arturo Revilla and José Luis Jiménez García (2015); Truper, Parque Industrial Jilitepec, Mexico, Ambiente Arquitectos (2013); The White Sea, Africa House, London, UK, Architect Michael Ashenheim (2013); Hoja, proa, brújula, Biblioteca de Mexico, Mexico City, Taller 6ª (2012); Hoja, árbol, bosque, Museo INAH Cancún, Mexico, Architect Alberto García Lascurain (2012); Lamento, Museo Memoria y Tolerancia, Mexico City. Arditti Arquitectos (2010); Refugio / Kiosko, Alameda de Puebla, Puebla, Mexico (2009); Helix, Student Center Central Patio, Education City, Qatar, Legorreta + Legorreta Arquitectos (2008–2010); Runas, Librería Rosario Castellanos, Centro Cultural Bella Época, Mexico City, Architect Teodoro González de León (2006); Script, Rectoría de la Universidad Autónoma Metropolitana, Iztapalapa, México City, Architect Alberto García Lascurain (2005); Alfabeto (in collaboration with Uzyel Karp), Centro de Diseño Cine y Televisión, Mexico City, Architects Alejandro Hernández and Carlos Tello (2004); Habita / Villa Serbelloni, Hotel Habita, Mexico City, Architects Enrique Norten and Bernardo Gómez Pimenta (2000). Along his career, he has produced books with several writers, Seamus Heaney, Hans Van de Waarsenburg, Bert Schierbeek and Gabriel García Márquez among others. His work is part of public and private collections, amongst others, including the Instituto Nacional de Bellas Artes, Mexico City, Mexico; Bibliothèque Nationale, Paris, France; Bonnefanten Museum, Maastricht, The Netherlands; Fundación Cultural Televisa, Mexico City, Mexico; Instituto de Artes Gráficas de Oaxaca, Mexico; Koninklijke Bibliotheek, The Hague, The Netherlands; Fundación Rodríguez Acosta, Granada, Spain; Rijksmuseum Twente, Enschede, The Netherlands; Stedelijk Museum, Amsterdam, The Netherlands; Rijksmuseum, Amsterdam, The Netherlands; Museo Universitario de Arte Contemporáneo, UNAM, Mexico City, Mexico; Museum of Modern Art, Dublin, Ireland; Colección Jaques y Natasha Gellman, Mexico; Colección de la Ciudad de Madrid, Spain. Fundación César Manrique, Lanzarote, Spain; Stanford University, San Francisco, USA.

In 2008 he received the International Prize of Innovation in Graphic Art, National Prize of Graphic Art, given by the Calcografia Nacional of the Real Academia de Bellas Artes de San Fernando, Spain. In 2012, he received the Order of the Aztec Eagle, the highest honor awarded to foreigners in Mexico. In 2019, the Kingdom of the Netherlands granted him a knighthood in the Order of Orange-Nassau.

Art
All projects start with drawing and go through different processes, which are in turn translated into final works. These range from artist's books, print editions, enamel installations, etched glass and paintings to architectural projects. Through his work Hendrix explores the dissection of a chosen landscape into details and composition, structure and flora. Among many projects, over the last years Hendrix has focused on the first gathering of plants at Kamay Botany Bay by Joseph Banks, Daniel Solander and Sydney Parkinson; part of the Endeavour expedition of 1770, 250 years ago.

Since the 2000s, he has held an average of three to four exhibitions each year. In the 1970s and early 1980s, he started with multiple exhibitions at galleries in the Netherlands such as Agora Studio in Maastricht and Printshop and Galerie Clement in Amsterdam then the Galería de Arte Mexicano in Mexico City after he took up residence. He began exhibiting solo in 1975 and since has participated in both solo and group exhibitions in Mexico, Europe, the United States, Asia and Africa.

A number of these were major exhibitions which toured in multiple places. Bitacora consists of images from various countries. It was exhibited in the Wan Fung Gallery in Beijing, Zhu Qi-Zhan Museum in Shanghai, Erasmushuis, in Djakarta, UTS Gallery Sydney, Tropenmuseum, Amsterdam, Museum of Painting and Sculpture in Ankara and the Centro de la Imagen, Mexico City. Storyboard was exhibited in the Instituto Cultural Cabañas in Guadalajara, Museo Amparo, Puebla and Museo de Arte Contemporáneo de Monterrey. Botánica was exhibited at the Calcografía Nacional de España in Madrid, Espacio Cultural Metropolitano in Tampico, Museo de Arte in Querétaro, Centro Cultural Tijuana, Galería de Arte Mexicano in Mexico City.

Hendrix donated sixty paintings as part of the Trabjajo de Campo exhibition to the Secretariat of Finance and Public Credit of Mexico to keep the pieces together. The works are based on photographs of landscapes from Kenya, Egypt, other parts of Africa, Australia, China and Mexico.

He work can be found in numerous public and private collections in various parts of the world including, Instituto Nacional de Bellas Artes y Literatura, National Council for Culture and Arts of Mexico, Hiscox in London, Institution Ferial de Extremadura, Junta de Extremadura, the Bankinter Collection, the Baker & McKenzie Collection, the Caixanova Collection, the Museo de la Comunidad de Madrid, Rodriguez Acosta Foundation in Granada, Bibliothèque nationale de France, Bonnefanten Museum, Fundación Cultural Televisa, Institution de Artes Gráficas in Oaxaca, Museum Von Bommel and Tropenmuseum in Amsterdam, Museo Universitario de Ciencias y Arte of UNAM and Irish Museum of Modern Art .

Published works
He has collaborated with various writers to design and illustrate their books including Gabriel García Márquez, Seamus Heaney and Bert Schierbeek, with books containing his work published in Mexico, Spain and England. These include The Golden Bough (1992), Light of the Leaves (1999), Vivir para contarla (2004) and After Nature (Spanish language version) in 2005. Most contain serigraphs.

Architectural work
A portion of his work since the 2000s has been murals and other works related to architecture, collaborating with numerous architects. His first architectural project was in the Hotel Habita working with Enrique Norten and Bernardo Gomez-Pimienta . He did enameled murals at the Punta del Parque building and entrance mural at the Atelier Building in Santa Fe, Mexico City . The lighted ceiling designed by Hendrix of the Rosario Castellanos Library is the most attractive element of the Centro Cultural Bella Época in Colonia Condesa. It is made of glass with abstract shapes in black and white and creates the sensation of being under the canopy of a jungle. He worked on the facade of Universidad Autónoma Metropolitana-Iztapalapa with Alberto Garcia Lascurain, as well as the facade of the Centro de Diseño, Cine y Television in Mexico City. He collaborated with the Arditti architectural firm for the Museo de Memoria y Tolerancia and with architect Ricardo Legorreta for the student center of Education City of the Qatar Foundation.

Other activities
In the 1990s, Hendrix worked on set designs for the National Theatre Company of Mexico at the request of Alejandro Luna, as well as the set for the monologue Keisho/Maquillaje in Mexico City. From the 1970s to the present, he has been a guest lecturer or otherwise taught at the Akademie voor Kunst en Industrie in Enschede, the Netherlands, the Centro de Investigación y Experimentación Plástica in Mexico City, the Jan Van Eyck Akademie in Maastricht, Centro Nacional de las Artes in Mexico City, Bilboarte in Bilbao, Spain and the Centro Cultural Tijuana, in Tijuana, Mexico. His first residency was in 1999 at the Villa Serbelloni in Bellagio, Italy sponsored by the Rockefeller Foundation. Others since then have been with the Budanon Trust in Budanon, Australia, Centro de las Arte de San Agustin in San Agustín Etla, Oaxaca and the Cesar Manrique Foundation in Lanzarote, Canary Islands. In 2006, he was curator for the exhibition Alarca, 54 artistas contemporáneos. Talavera de la Reyna" at the Beijing National Fine Arts Museum. He has been a part of the Sistema Nacional de Creadores de Arte from 1993 to 1999 and again from 2004 to 2007.

Recognition
In 2012, the artist was awarded the Order of the Aztec Eagle, the highest Mexican award given to foreigners for his work in art and architecture. He is the third Dutchman to receive the honor.

See also
 Kiosko (Hendrix)

References

1949 births
Living people
Dutch artists
Dutch contemporary artists
Dutch emigrants to Mexico
Mexican artists
Mexican contemporary artists
People from Peel en Maas
Qatar Foundation people